John Chubb may refer to:
 John Chubb (artist) 1746–1818, English amateur artist of Bridgwater, Somerset.
 John Chubb (locksmith) (1816–1872), English locksmith and inventor
 John Chubb (political scientist), see EdisonLearning
 John Chubb of the Chubb baronets
 John D. Chubb, architect, see Ishpeming Carnegie Public Library

See also
 Chubb (disambiguation)